Fred Daniel Marolewski (October 6, 1928 – February 28, 2023) was an American professional baseball player whose eight-season career (1948–1950; 1953–1957) included one inning in one game played in Major League Baseball as a member of the 1953 St. Louis Cardinals.

Marolewski was recalled by the Cardinals in September 1953 after spending most of the season with the Houston Buffaloes of the Double-A Texas League. On the 19th, Marolewski entered an extra-inning game between St. Louis and the Chicago Cubs at Sportsman's Park in the top of the 12th frame as a defensive replacement for first baseman Steve Bilko. During that half-inning, the Cubs took a three-run lead on the strength of RBI hits by future Hall of Famers Ralph Kiner and Ernie Banks. Both Retrosheet and Baseball Reference record that Marolewski had no fielding chances during the Cubs' half of the 12th. In the Cardinals' half of the inning, he was left in the on-deck circle when Ray Jablonski made the final out of the game, denying Marolewski an MLB at bat.

Marolewski returned to the Texas League in 1954. As a player in minor league baseball, Marolewski played in 1,077 games and smashed over 100 home runs.

Marolewski died on February 28, 2023, at the age of 94.

References

External links

1928 births
2023 deaths
Albany Cardinals players
Allentown Cardinals players
Baseball players from Chicago
Baseball players from Illinois
Birmingham Barons players
Columbus Foxes players
Columbus Red Birds players
Houston Buffaloes players
Major League Baseball first basemen
Oklahoma City Indians players
Omaha Cardinals players
St. Joseph Cardinals players
St. Louis Cardinals players
San Antonio Missions players